The 2017 Nova Scotia Scotties Tournament of Hearts, the provincial women's curling championship of Nova Scotia, was held from January 24 to 29 at the Mayflower Curling Club in Halifax. The winning Mary Mattatall team represented Nova Scotia at the 2017 Scotties Tournament of Hearts in St. Catharines, Ontario.

The winning Mattatall rink were all senior-aged, with all members of the team being over 50 years old. Mattatall won her sixth provincial title of her career, and her first since 2005 when she played third for Kay Zinck. Third Andrea Saulnier and second Jill Alcoe-Holland had both won provincial seniors titles in 2010 and lead Marg Cutcliffe won the provincial masters championship in 2016 for curlers over 60.

The top seed in the event was the defending champion Jill Brothers team, which earned a direct spot in the tournament along with former World Champion Mary-Anne Arsenault.

Teams
Teams were as follows:

Round robin standings

Scores
Draw 1
Arsenault 9-8 McConnery
Brothers 5-4 Gamble
Mattatall 7-4 Breen
McEvoy 10-5 MacDiarmid

Draw 2
Breen 9-4 Gamble
Arsenault 6-5 McEvoy
MacDiarmid 8-6 McConnery
Mattatall 7-6 Brothers

Draw 3
Mattatall 7-5 MacDiarmid
Breen 10-4 McConnery
Brothers 6-4 McEvoy
Gamble 7-4 Arsenault

Draw 4
McEvoy 8-7 McConnery
Mattatall 8-4 Gamble
MacDiarmid 6-5 Arsenault
Brothers 7-4 Breen

Draw 5
Arsenault 7-5 Mattatall
McConnery 8-6 Brothers
McEvoy 5-4 Breen
MacDiarmid 8-3 Gamble

Draw 6
Brothers 6-4 MacDiarmid
Mattatall 7-6 McEvoy
Gamble 11-7 McConnery
Breen 7-5 Arsenault

Draw 7
McEvoy 9-4 Gamble
Breen 7-6 MacDiarmid
Brothers 6-5 Arsenault
Mattatall 7-4 McConnery

Tiebreaker
Breen 8-4 McEvoy

Playoffs

Semifinal
Saturday, January 28, 6:00pm

Final
Sunday, January 29, 2:00pm

References

Nova Scotia
Curling competitions in Halifax, Nova Scotia
2017 in Nova Scotia
January 2017 sports events in Canada